Johan Kullerkup also known by his stage name Põhjamaade Hirm (English: Nordic Fear) is an Estonian rapper. He won a rap battle contest called  "MC Battle" in 2005 which increased his popularity in the Estonian hip hop community. Põhjamaade Hirm is also known for being one half of the rap group Kuuluud with fellow producer Tatmo Savvo. He has also made an album of his own called Maailma Südame Põhjast (From the Heart of the World).

He is signed to Legendaarne Records which is owned by G-Enka and DJ Paul Oja.

Albums
Studio albums
 2006: Maailma Südame Põhjast
 2021: Nagu Vaataks Pilvi
With Kuuluud
 2008: Kummuli kaheksa, üheksanda maailma imelik
With DVPH

 2013: Mõtted on mujal
 2014: Natuke veel

References

External links

Living people
Estonian rappers
21st-century Estonian male singers
Year of birth missing (living people)